Stolberg is a German detective television series which ran from 2006 until 2013 on ZDF, starring Düsseldorf chief inspector Martin Stolberg (Rudolf Kowalski). The series is more serious and less flashy than other contemporary German detective series.

Cast
 Rudolf Kowalski - chief inspector
 Victoria Mayer - detective
 Aurel Manthei - detective
 Eva Scheurer - forensic investigator
 Annett Renneberg - detective
 Wanja Mues - detective
 Jasmin Schwiers - detective

References

External links
 
 Interview with Rudolf Kowalski about Stolberg
 Network Movie official website

2006 German television series debuts
2013 German television series endings
German drama television series
German crime television series
2000s German police procedural television series
2010s German police procedural television series
Detective television series
Television shows set in North Rhine-Westphalia
German-language television shows
ZDF original programming